Rory Fitzpatrick (born 21 June 1980) is an Irish sailor. He competed in the Laser event at the 2004 Summer Olympics.

References

External links
 

1980 births
Living people
Irish male sailors (sport)
Olympic sailors of Ireland
Sailors at the 2004 Summer Olympics – Laser
Sportspeople from Dublin (city)